Murder Without Tears is a 1953 American thriller film directed by William Beaudine, starring Craig Stevens, Joyce Holden and Richard Benedict.

Cast
 Craig Stevens as Detective Sergeant Steve O'Malley 
 Joyce Holden as Joyce Fitzgerald 
 Richard Benedict as Joe 'Candy Markwell' Martola 
 Edward Norris as Warren Richards 
 Clair Regis as Lilly Richards 
 Tom Hubbard as Det. Pete Morgan 
 Murray Alper as Jim, the Bartender 
 Robert Carson as Dan, the District Attorney 
 Leonard Penn as Defense Attorney Parker 
 Hal Gerard as Dr. Saul Polito 
 Fred Kelsey as Sergeant-at-arms 
 Jack George as Sam Gordon, Pawnbroker  
 Bess Flowers as Bank Customer  
 Hal Miller as Coroner 
 Frank Mills as Courtroom Extra

References

Bibliography
 Marshall, Wendy L. William Beaudine: From Silents to Television. Scarecrow Press, 2005.

External links

1953 films
American thriller films
American black-and-white films
1950s thriller films
1950s English-language films
Films directed by William Beaudine
Allied Artists films
1950s American films